Helogenes uruyensis is a species of the whale catfish that is endemic to Venezuela, where it is found in the Uruyén River basin.  This species reaches a length of 4.3 cm (1.7 inches).

References 
 

Cetopsidae
Endemic fauna of Venezuela
Fish of Venezuela
Fish described in 1967